Antti Veikko Ilmari Siltavuori (29 October 1926 – 9 March 2012), better known as Jammu Siltavuori or Jammu-setä ("Uncle Jammu"), was a Finnish murderer and sexual offender.

Early life
Veikko Siltavuori was born in Vaasa, Finland. Information about his early life is very limited. According to some sources his childhood was very hard and complicated, because of his alcoholic father who beat Veikko very much. He was bullied in school and he was called a weasel because of his dirty clothing.

Crimes
Siltavuori became well known in Finland when he murdered two eight-year-old girls, Päivi-Maria Hopiavuori and Tanja Johanna Pirinen in 1989. He burned the bodies shortly after. He had picked up both girls into his car from Myllypuro, a neighbourhood in Helsinki, on 3 March 1989. Prior to this, he had been convicted of raping a five-year-old girl, sexual harassment, and attempted murder. He had previously been sentenced to life imprisonment in the 1960s, but was later paroled. He had also built a jail complete with cells, barred windows and small toilets in Paltamo, Kainuu.

Media publicity
The murders led to widespread media publicity, during which hundreds of letters to the editor were written about Siltavuori. An interview with Siltavuori was published in the April 1991 issue of Rikosposti, in which he said that he was the most hated person in Finland. There were demands for the death penalty or castration for him.

Antti Siltavuori, an industrial designer from Kirkkonummi, was the target of a telephone terror because of his name, and an old man was beaten in a restaurant in Helsinki because he resembled Jammu in appearance. The protesters' signs read, among other things: "A sex offender does not get better in prison. Experts in favor of involuntary treatment."

Sentences
For the two murders in 1989, Veikko Siltavuori was sentenced to 15 years in prison with the possibility of parole after 10 years, because a mental health examination legally found him to be partially insane. If that had not been the case, Siltavuori would have been again sentenced to life imprisonment.

After 10 years elapsed, his first and second parole hearings in a Prison Court were unsuccessful. After he served one more year in jail, the Prison Court released him on strictly supervised parole on 31 January 2000, on his third parole hearing. However, he was immediately involuntary committed to the Niuvanniemi mental hospital in Kuopio for criminal-psychiatric reasons. The involuntary commitment was reaffirmed in 2007 by the administrative court of Kuopio, on the basis that if he was released, he would be a serious security risk.

Death
While imprisoned, Siltavuori was attacked by another inmate, which caused Siltavuori to spend his final years in a wheelchair. He died in March 2012 at the age of 85 in Kuopio.

References

Literature
 Markkula, Hannes: Kuusi suomalaista murhaa. 1996.

1926 births
2012 deaths
20th-century Finnish criminals
Finnish male criminals
People from Vaasa
Finnish murderers of children
Finnish people convicted of murder
People convicted of murder by Finland
People convicted of child sexual abuse
Violence against women in Finland